Harry Lowes Cowans (19 December 1932 – 3 October 1985) was a British Labour Party politician.

Cowans was elected Member of Parliament for Newcastle-upon-Tyne Central at a 1976 by-election.  After boundary changes, he was elected for Tyne Bridge in 1983. From 1983 to 1985, he served as Chair of the Transport Select Committee.

He died in office aged 52 in 1985, and his cremated remains are buried in Saltwell Cemetery, Gateshead

References
Times Guide to the House of Commons, 1983

External links 
 

1932 births
1985 deaths
Labour Party (UK) MPs for English constituencies
National Union of Railwaymen-sponsored MPs
UK MPs 1974–1979
UK MPs 1979–1983
UK MPs 1983–1987